James Cummins is a professor at the Ontario Institute for Studies in Education of the University of Toronto where he works on language development and literacy development of learners of English as an additional language. In 1979 Cummins coined the acronyms BICS and CALP to refer to processes that help a teacher to qualify a student's language ability.

BICS (Basic Interpersonal Communicative Skills)

BICS refers to the basic communicative fluency achieved by all normal native speakers of a language. It is cognitively undemanding and contextual and is better understood as the language used by students in informal settings, say, on a playground or cafe.  Research by Cummins as well as Virginia Collier suggest that it typically takes language learners 1–3 years to develop BICS if they have sufficient exposure to the second language, "with the exception of severely retarded and autistic children".

CALP (Cognitive Academic Language Proficiency/Academic Language Proficiency)

CALP refers to the ability to manipulate language using abstractions in a sophisticated manner. CALP is used while performing in an academic setting.  CALP is the ability to think in and use a language as a tool for learning.  Cummins's and Collier's research suggest that K-12 students need 5 to 7 years to acquire CALP in the second language if the learner has native language literacy.  Learners who do not have strong native language literacy often need 7–10 years to acquire CALP in the second language.

Bibliography 

 Jim Cummins:  Bilingual Children's Mother Tongue: Why Is It Important for Education? 2003. (fiplv.org).
 Jim Cummins u. a.:  ELL Students Speak for Themselves: Identity Texts and Literacy Engagement in Multilingual Classrooms. 2008. (achievementseminars.com).
 Jim Cummins:  Teaching for Cross-Language Transfer in Dual Language Education: Possibilities and Pitfalls. 2005. (achievementseminars.com).
 Jim Cummins u. a.:  Affirming Identity in Multilingual Classrooms. (ascd.org).
 CUMMINS, James (Jim). Die Bedeutung der Muttersprache mehrsprachiger Kinder für die Schule. (kompetenzzentrum-sprachfoerderung.de).

References

External links

Cummins's home page 
Research Gate
Knowledge Matrix Summary

Canadian educational theorists
Living people
Academic staff of the University of Toronto
Place of birth missing (living people)
Year of birth missing (living people)